The 2022 Mid-American Conference football season wwas the 77th season for the Mid-American Conference (MAC), as part of the 2022 NCAA Division I FBS football season. The season began on September 1 and concluded with its conference championship game on Saturday, December 3 at Ford Field in Detroit, Michigan.  Ohio won the East Division with a conference record of 7–1 and Toledo won the West Division with a 5–3 conference record. Toledo won the championship over Ohio by a final score of 17–7.

Previous season

During the 2021 conference season, Kent State won the East Division, while Northern Illinois won the West Division, both with 6–2 conference records. In the 2021 MAC Championship Game, Northern Illinois defeated Kent State by a final score of 41–23. Northern Illinois advanced to the Cure Bowl, where they lost to Coastal Carolina, 41–47.

Preseason

Preseason polls

Media Poll
On July 26  the MAC announced the preseason media poll.  Defending MAC champion Northern Illinois was named the preseason favorite.

Coaches Poll
On August 29 the MAC released the coaches poll.  Defending champion Northern Illinois was favored to win the west while Kent State was selected as a slight favorite to win the East.  Northern Illinois received 4 of the 12 MAC championship votes.

Individual awards

Head Coaches
On November 4, 2021, Akron fired head coach Tom Arth after posting a 3–24 record during his tenure with the school. The school hired Oregon offensive coordinator Joe Moorhead as the new head coach for the 2022 season.

Post-season changes
On November 28, Western Michigan announced that they had fired head coach Tim Lester. Lester posted a record of 37–32 over six years at the school. On December 8, Western Michigan announced that they had hired Louisville offensive coordinator Lance Taylor to be the new head coach.
On December 5, Kent State head coach Sean Lewis was announced as the new offensive coordinator at Colorado in the Pac-12 conference. On December 14, Kent State announced Kenni Burns as the new head coach for the 2023 season.

Rankings

Schedule
The schedule for the 2022 MAC football season was released on February 25, 2022.

All times Eastern time.

Week 1

Week 2

Week 3

Week 4

Week 5

Week 6

Week 7

Week 8

Week 9

Week 10

Week 11

Week 12

Week 13

MAC Conference Championship Game

Postseason

Bowl Games

The MAC finished with a 4–2 bowl record which was good enough to win the Bowl Challenge Cup

Selection of teams
Bowl eligible (6): Bowling Green, Buffalo, Eastern Michigan, Miami (OH), Ohio, Toledo
Bowl ineligible (6): Akron, Ball State, Central Michigan, Kent State, Northern Illinois, Western Michigan

MAC records vs. other conferences
2022–2023 records against non-conference foes:

Regular Season

Postseason

Mid-American vs Power 5 matchups
This is a list of games the MAC has scheduled versus power conference teams (ACC, Big Ten, Big 12, Pac-12, BYU, Notre Dame and SEC). All rankings are from the current AP Poll at the time of the game.

Mid-American vs Group of Five matchups
The following games include MAC teams competing against teams from the American, C-USA, Mountain West or Sun Belt.

Mid-American vs FBS independents matchups
The following games include MAC  teams competing against FBS Independents, which includes Army, Liberty, New Mexico State, UConn, or UMass.

Mid-American vs. FCS matchups
The following games include MAC teams competing against FCS schools.

Head to head matchups

Updated with the results of all games through December 3, 2022.

Awards and honors

Player of the week honors

East Division

West Division

MAC Individual Awards
The following individuals received postseason honors as voted by the Mid-American Conference football coaches at the end of the season.

All-Conference Teams
The following players were listed as part of the All-Conference teams.

References

2022 Mid-American Conference football season